Hallissey is an English-language surname, derived from the Irish-language, and traditionally associated with the Irish counties of Cork and Kerry.

Etymology

The name is derived from the Irish Ó hÁilgheasa, a patronym meaning "descendant of Áilgheas". The latter personal name is derived from the Irish áilgheas, meaning "eagerness". The modern Irish form of the name is Ó hÁileasa.

Cognates

Other English-language surnames cognate to Hallissey include Hallessy, Hallisey, Hallisy, Hallissy, Hallisay, O Hallishy, and O Hallyse.

Distribution

The surname Hallissey is traditionally found in County Cork and County Kerry, particularly in west Cork and south Kerry.

People

Hallisey
 Charles Hallisey, lecturer on Buddhist literature
 Connor Hallisey, American soccer player
 Laura Hallisey, American curler
 Olivia Hallisey, American student who invented a rapid test for Ebola

Hallissey
 Claire Hallissey, British marathon runner

Hallisay
 Brian Hallisay, American actor

References

English-language surnames
Surnames of Irish origin
Anglicised Irish-language surnames